Skelton is a small hamlet in the Richmondshire district of North Yorkshire, England. It is within the Yorkshire Dales National Park near the larger village of Marske in Swaledale. Along with the other Skelton's in Yorkshire, the name derives from Old English and means The farm on a shelf of land.

During the 17th century, on the moors around Skelton were several lead mines.

References

Hamlets in North Yorkshire
Richmondshire